Gundars Celitāns (born 14 June 1985) is a Latvian male volleyball player. His brother, Armands Celitāns, is also a volleyball player.
Gundars won Best Player in Serie A1 2012-2013.

Clubs
 LASE-R (2004-2007)
 AS Cannes Volley-Ball (2007-2008)
 Halkbank Ankara (2009-2012)
 Modena Volley (2012-2013)
 İstanbul Büyükşehir Belediyesi (2013-2015)
 Seoul Woori Card Hansae (2015–present)

References

External links
 

1985 births
Living people
Latvian men's volleyball players
AS Cannes Volley-Ball players
VC Belogorie players
Halkbank volleyball players
Modena Volley players
Seoul Woori Card Hansae players
Sportspeople from Daugavpils